Cutch or Kutch may refer to:
Kutch, a district of Gujarat, India
Cutch State, a princely state of British India
Cutch Agency, a political agency of British India
Catechu, an extract of Acacia also called cutch
Cutch (steamship), a steamship built in 1884 in Hull, England

See also
 Kutch (disambiguation)
 Kutchi (disambiguation)
 Andrew McCutchen (born 1986), professional baseball outfielder